This is a list of 137 species in Aprionus, a genus of wood midges in the family Cecidomyiidae.

Aprionus species

 Aprionus aberrantis Mamaev, 1998
 Aprionus abiskoensis Jaschhof, 1996
 Aprionus accipitris Jaschhof, 1997
 Aprionus acutus Edwards, 1938
 Aprionus adventitius Jaschhof, 2009
 Aprionus angeloides Jaschhof, 1997
 Aprionus angulatus Mamaev, 1963
 Aprionus aquilonius Jaschhof, 2009
 Aprionus arcticus Mamaev, 2001
 Aprionus asemus Pritchard, 1947
 Aprionus aviarius Mamaev & Berest, 1990
 Aprionus balduri Jaschhof & Jaschhof, 2017
 Aprionus barbatus Mamaev, 1963
 Aprionus berestae Fedotova, 2004
 Aprionus bestlae Jaschhof & Jaschhof, 2017
 Aprionus betulae Jaschhof, 1996
 Aprionus betuloides Jaschhof, 2015
 Aprionus bicorniger Mamaev, 1998
 Aprionus bidentatus (Kieffer, 1894)
 Aprionus bifidus Mamaev, 1963
 Aprionus bifurcatus Bu & Zheng, 1996
 Aprionus bispinosus Edwards, 1938
 Aprionus blanditus Mamaev, 1998
 Aprionus borri Jaschhof & Jaschhof, 2017
 Aprionus bostrichus Berest, 1997
 Aprionus brachypterus Edwards, 1938
 Aprionus brevitegminis Jaschhof, 2009
 Aprionus bullerensis Jaschhof, 2004
 Aprionus cardiophorus Mamaev, 1963
 Aprionus carinatus Jaschhof, 1996
 Aprionus carpathicus Mamaev, 1991
 Aprionus caucasicus Mamaev & Jaschhof, 1997
 Aprionus complicatus Mamaev, 1995
 Aprionus confusus Mamaev, 1988
 Aprionus corniculatus Mamaev, 1963
 Aprionus cornutus Berest, 1986
 Aprionus dalarnensis Mamaev, 1998
 Aprionus delectabilis Mamaev, 1998
 Aprionus demonstrativus Mamaev, 1998
 Aprionus denticulus Berest, 1986
 Aprionus dentifer Mamaev, 1965
 Aprionus dispar Mamaev, 1963
 Aprionus dissectus Mamaev & Berest, 1990
 Aprionus duplicatus Mamaev, 1998
 Aprionus ensiferus Jaschhof, 1996
 Aprionus fennicus Jaschhof, 2009
 Aprionus ferulae Mamaev, 1998
 Aprionus flavidus (Winnertz, 1870)
 Aprionus flavoscuta (Felt, 1907)
 Aprionus foliosus Jaschhof, 2009
 Aprionus fontanus Jaschhof & Jaschhof, 2017
 Aprionus forshagei Jaschhof & Jaschhof, 2015
 Aprionus friggae Jaschhof & Jaschhof, 2017
 Aprionus fujisanensis Jaschhof & Jaschhof, 2017
 Aprionus gladiator Jaschhof, 2009
 Aprionus gustavssoni Jaschhof & Jaschhof, 2015
 Aprionus halteratus (Zetterstedt, 1852)
 Aprionus hamulatus Bu & Zheng, 1996
 Aprionus heothinos Jaschhof, 2009
 Aprionus hintelmannorum Jaschhof, 2009
 Aprionus hugini Jaschhof & Jaschhof, 2017
 Aprionus hybridus Jaschhof, 2009
 Aprionus inaccessibilis Fedotova, 2004
 Aprionus indictus Mamaev & Jaschhof, 1997
 Aprionus inquisitor Mamaev, 1963
 Aprionus insignis Mamaev, 1963
 Aprionus internuntius Jaschhof, 2003
 Aprionus interruptus Yukawa, 1967
 Aprionus karlssonorum Jaschhof & Jaschhof, 2015
 Aprionus karsios Jaschhof, 2009
 Aprionus laevis Mohrig, 1967
 Aprionus lapponicus Jaschhof & Mamaev, 1997
 Aprionus laricis Mamaev & Jaschhof, 1997
 Aprionus latens Mamaev & Berest, 1990
 Aprionus latitegminis Jaschhof, 2009
 Aprionus lindgrenae Jaschhof & Jaschhof, 2015
 Aprionus longicollis Mamaev, 1963
 Aprionus longipennis (Felt, 1908)
 Aprionus longisetus Mohrig, 1967
 Aprionus longitegminis Yukawa, 1967
 Aprionus magnii Jaschhof & Jaschhof, 2017
 Aprionus magnussoni Jaschhof & Jaschhof, 2015
 Aprionus marginatus Mamaev, 1963
 Aprionus miki Kieffer, 1895
 Aprionus miniusculus Mamaev, 1998
 Aprionus miserandus Mamaev, 2001
 Aprionus monticola (Felt, 1920)
 Aprionus montivagus Jaschhof & Jaschhof, 2017
 Aprionus mossbergi Jaschhof & Jaschhof, 2020
 Aprionus multispinosus Yukawa, 1971
 Aprionus munini Jaschhof & Jaschhof, 2017
 Aprionus mycophiloides Jaschhof, 2004
 Aprionus odini Jaschhof & Jaschhof, 2017
 Aprionus ogawaensis Jaschhof & Jaschhof, 2017
 Aprionus oligodactylus Jaschhof, 2009
 Aprionus oljonsbyensis Jaschhof & Jaschhof, 2020
 Aprionus paludosus Jaschhof & Mamaev, 1997
 Aprionus piceae Jaschhof, 1997
 Aprionus pigmentalis Mamaev, 1998
 Aprionus pinicorticis (Felt, 1908)
 Aprionus pommeranicus Jaschhof & Mamaev, 1997
 Aprionus praecipuus Jaschhof, 2009
 Aprionus pratincolus Jaschhof & Meyer, 1995
 Aprionus pseudispar Jaschhof, 1997
 Aprionus pyxidiifer Mamaev, 1998
 Aprionus reduncus Jaschhof, 2009
 Aprionus remotus Jaschhof, 2004
 Aprionus rostratus Mamaev & Berest, 1990
 Aprionus rotundata (Plakidas, 2017)
 Aprionus separatus Mamaev & Jaschhof, 1997
 Aprionus sievertorum Jaschhof, 2009
 Aprionus sifae Jaschhof & Jaschhof, 2017
 Aprionus similis Mamaev, 1963
 Aprionus sleipniri Jaschhof & Jaschhof, 2017
 Aprionus smirnovi Mamaev, 1961
 Aprionus spiniferus Mamaev & Berest, 1990
 Aprionus spiniger (Kieffer, 1894)
 Aprionus stiktos Jaschhof, 2009
 Aprionus surcula (Plakidas, 2018)
 Aprionus stylatus Mamaev & Jaschhof, 1997
 Aprionus stylifer Mamaev, 1998
 Aprionus styloideus Mamaev & Berest, 1990
 Aprionus subacutus Jaschhof, 1997
 Aprionus subbetulae Jaschhof, 2015
 Aprionus surtri Jaschhof & Jaschhof, 2017
 Aprionus svecicus Jaschhof, 1996
 Aprionus taigaensis Jaschhof, 2009
 Aprionus terrestris Mamaev, 1963
 Aprionus thori Jaschhof & Jaschhof, 2017
 Aprionus tiliamcorticis Mamaev, 1963
 Aprionus transitivus Mamaev, 1998
 Aprionus transmutatus Mamaev, 1998
 Aprionus tyri Jaschhof & Jaschhof, 2017
 Aprionus umbrellus Mamaev & Berest, 1990
 Aprionus victoriae Jaschhof, 2009
 Aprionus wildeni Jaschhof, 1997
 Aprionus ymiri Jaschhof & Jaschhof, 2017

References

Aprionus
Aprionus